Kimberley Woods (born 8 September 1995) is a British slalom canoeist who has competed at the international level since 2011.

She won nine medals at the ICF Canoe Slalom World Championships with four golds (C1 team: 2017, 2018, K1 team: 2019, 2021), two silvers (Extreme K1: 2022, K1 team: 2015) and three bronzes (K1: 2021, K1 team: 2018, C1 team: 2022). She has also won 12 medals (8 golds, 2 silvers and 2 bronzes) at the European Championships.

She qualified to represent Great Britain at the 2020 Summer Olympics in Tokyo in the Women's K1 event where she finished in 10th place.

World Cup individual podiums

References

External links

1995 births
English female canoeists
Living people
British female canoeists
Medalists at the ICF Canoe Slalom World Championships
Olympic canoeists of Great Britain
Canoeists at the 2020 Summer Olympics
20th-century British women
21st-century British women